Belmont Abbey is an American-Cassinese monastery of Benedictine monks and a minor basilica in the town of Belmont, North Carolina, a suburb of Charlotte. The Abbey Basilica of Mary Help of Christians was listed on the National Register of Historic Places in 1973.

History
Father Jeremiah O'Connell O.S.B. was a missionary priest who had built St. Mary's College in Columbia, South Carolina, but it had been destroyed during the Civil War. In 1876 he bought the 500-acre former Caldwell farm and donated it to the Benedictines of Saint Vincent Archabbey in Latrobe, Pennsylvania in hopes they would establish an educational institution in North Carolina. Under the direction of Abbot Boniface Wimmer of St. Vincent, the Benedictines set about to establish a monastery and college. The monks constructed the buildings from red clay. In 1884, the monastery was designated by the Holy See as Mary Help of Christians Abbey and Father Leo Michael Haid was elected the first abbot, a position he held until his death in 1924.

In July 1886, the first three novices professed vows and an alumnus of the college became a novice. That same year, Haid founded a seminary at Belmont. On February 4, 1888, he was appointed Vicar Apostolic of North Carolina and was consecrated bishop at the Baltimore Cathedral by Cardinal James Gibbons on July 1, 1888, becoming the first American abbot-bishop.

In May 1891 the Grotto of Our Lady of Lourdes was dedicated as a pilgrimage shrine by Abbot Haid. Katharine Drexel, a benefactor of the monastery and college, visited Belmont Abbey in 1904.

Territorial abbey
From 1910 through 1977, Belmont Abbey was a territorial abbey, exercising some functions of a diocese. It had responsibility for parishes in the North Carolina counties of Gaston, Catawba, Cleveland, Burke, Lincoln, McDowell, Polk, and Rutherford.  In 1944, its territory, except for Gaston County, was given to the Diocese of Raleigh.  In July 1960, Gaston County too was placed under the Diocese of Raleigh. In 1977, its status as a territorial abbey was suppressed under the Diocese of Charlotte.

Abbey Basilica of Mary Help of Christians
Construction began on the Abbey Church of Mary Help of Christians in 1892 and was completed in 1894. The Abbey Church was dedicated 11 April 11, 1894. The church is a large cruciform plan, Gothic Revival style brick church. It has a steep gable roof and the front facade features two towers of unequal size. On July 27, 1998, the Vatican issued a decree elevating the abbey church at Belmont to the rank of a minor basilica. The church features a baptismal font carved from a stone upon which African American slaves were once sold on the North Carolina market.

St. Mary's College

Father Herman Wolfe, O.S.B. and two students arrived in April 1876. The first students graduated in 1878. In April 1886 the state of North Carolina issued Saint Mary's College a charter authorizing the abbey/school to grant degrees. Two-thirds of the College Building was destroyed by fire in 1900. Rebuilding began immediately. In 1913 Saint Mary's adopted the Belmont Abbey name.

On June 20, 2011, Belmont Abbey College broke ground for a residences for female students with or expecting children—regardless of religious affiliation—that can hold 15 babies, 15 women (who can stay for up to two years), and 8 toddlers at a time, with a shared living room, dining room, and laundry room. The residence, called "Room at the Inn" is operated by a Charlotte, North Carolina-based maternity and aftercare center of the same name.

In May 2020, the college announced it was starting a nursing program to address the continuing healthcare needs in Gaston County.

On July 14, 1993, the central campus was entered on the National Register of Historic Places as the "Belmont Abbey National Historic District."

Present day
The abbey is the motherhouse to Saint Leo Abbey in Tampa, Florida, as well as Mary Mother of the Church Abbey in Richmond, Virginia. The monks also are the benefactors of Belmont Abbey College, a four-year Catholic liberal arts school. As of 2020, there are about twenty monks at Belmont Abbey.

See also
List of Catholic cathedrals in the United States

References

External links
Official website

Properties of religious function on the National Register of Historic Places in North Carolina
Gothic Revival architecture in North Carolina
Belmont Abbey College
Benedictine monasteries in the United States
Roman Catholic cathedrals in North Carolina
Our Lady Mary Help of Christians Basilica
Roman Catholic Diocese of Charlotte
Religious organizations established in 1876
Shrines to the Virgin Mary
Buildings and structures in Gaston County, North Carolina
1876 establishments in North Carolina
National Register of Historic Places in Gaston County, North Carolina
Tourist attractions in Gaston County, North Carolina